Jean-Jacques is a French name, equivalent to "John James" in English. Since the second half of 18th century, Jean Jacques Rousseau was widely known as Jean Jacques. Notable people bearing this name include:

Given name
 Jean-Jacques Annaud (born 1943), French film director, screenwriter and producer
 John James Audubon, born Jean-Jacques Rabin (1785–1851), American ornithologist and painter of Breton origin
 Jean-Jacques Bertrand (1916–1973), Premier of Quebec, Canada
 Jean-Jacques Burnel (born 1952), Franco-English musician, bassist
 Jean-Jacques Challet-Venel (1811–1893), member of the Swiss Federal Council
 Jean-Jacques Colin (1784-1865), French chemist
 Jean-Jacques Conceição (born 1964), Angolan basketball player
 Jean-Jacques De Gucht (born 1983), Flemish politician and member of Open VLD
 Jean-Jacques Dessalines (1758–1806), a leader of the Haïtian Revolution
 Jean-Jacques Domoraud (born 1981), Côte d'Ivoire footballer
 Jean-Jacques Goldman (born 1951), French singer-songwriter
 Jean-Jacques Kieffer (1857–1925), French naturalist and entomologist 
 Jean-Jacques Lafon (born 1955), French singer-songwriter
 Jean-Jacques Lefranc, Marquis de Pompignan (1709–1784), French poet
 Jean-Jacques Manget (1652–1742), Swiss physician and writer
 Jean-Jacques Olier (1608–1657), French priest and the founder of the Sulpicians
 Jean-Jacques Perrey (1929–2016), French electronic music producer
 Jean-Jacques Rousseau (1712–1778), Genevan/French philosopher, widely known as Jean Jacques
 Jean-Jacques Servan-Schreiber (1924–2006), French journalist and politician
 Jean-Jacques Susini (1933-2017), French political figure and co-founder of the Organisation armée secrète
 Jean-Jacques Winders (1849–1936), Belgian architect

Surname
 Jamil Jean-Jacques (born 1975), a Haitian football player 
 Martin Jean-Jacques (born 1960), a Dominican cricketer

See also 
 1461 Jean-Jacques, a main belt asteroid
 Jean-Jacques: The Early Life and Work of Jean-Jacques Rousseau, 1712–1754
 Jean (male given name)
 Jacques, name list
 Dikembe Mutumbo, former Basketball player whose middle name is Jean-Jacques

References

French masculine given names
Compound given names